Ben Cat is a town located in the north of Binh Duong province in the urban area of Ho Chi Minh City, 50 km north of Ho Chi Minh City. 

Ben Cat is a grade 3 urban area under Binh Duong province, with a total natural area of 234.35 km², a population of 355,663 people and a population density of 1,518 people/km² divided into 5 wards (Chanh Phu Hoa, Hoa Loi, Tan Dinh, Thoi Hoa, My Phuoc) and 3 communes (An Dien, An Tay, Phu An), My Phuoc ward is considered the cultural, economic and political center of Ben Cat town. 

Ben Cat town borders Bau Bang district to the north, Dau Tieng district to the west, Tan Uyen township and Phu Giao district to the east, Thu Dau Mot city and Cu Chi district of Ho Chi Minh city to the south. 

Ben Cat is in the transition zone from the Truong Son range in the north of the central highland to the southern plain, so the general topography of the whole town is relatively high from 30 to 35m above sea level in the north and lower to the south. In the south, the climate belongs to the tropical savanna region, there is little flooding and the average annual rainfall is about 1,500-2,500mm, the average monthly temperature is 32°C during the day and 23°C at night, the hottest month is 36 °C and the coldest month is 16°C. In mid-December, the town often has dense fog in the early morning and ends at 7-8am.

Ben Cat is considered the southern key economic region, the industrial capital of Binh Duong province. In the whole area of ​​Ben Cat town, there are many industrial parks built as models with complete infrastructure, built in the direction of focusing on environmental protection, creating a green and clean industrial park according to the model. Forming a modern industrial and urban city towards long-term and sustainable development in the north of Binh Duong province. 

Currently, Ben Cat has many industrial parks, which have been deployed to phase 5 and have attracted 380 investment projects from 24 countries and territories with a total estimated capital of nearly 7.8 billion USD. Countries and territories with high investment rates in industrial parks are the United States, Taiwan, China, Korea, Japan, etc. Focusing on the following fields: electrical, electronic, mechanical industry manufacturing, food processing, wood industry and interior decoration, garment, supporting industries. The favorable geographical position has made industrial parks in Ben Cat an ideal place for investors to produce goods for domestic consumption as well as for export. Income per capita: 6,500 USD/year.

References

Districts of Bình Dương province
County-level towns in Vietnam